Ingi Þór Steinþórsson (born 9 May 1972) is an Icelandic professional basketball coach. He last coached Úrvalsdeild karla club KR.

As head coach, Ingi Þór has won the Icelandic men's national championship and the women's national championship three times each. He was named Úrvalsdeild karla Coach of the Year in 2010, when he won the Úrvalsdeild karla title with the Snæfell while also being named Úrvalsdeild kvenna Coach of the Year three times, in 2014–2016, when he led Snæfell women's team to a three-peat.

Ingi Þór served as an assistant coach at KR from 1998-1999 and 2008–2009, helping the club win the national championship in 2009.

On 12 June 2018 he was introduced as the next head coach of the reigning men's national champions, KR, replacing Finnur Freyr Stefánsson. On 4 May 2019, he won his third Úrvalsdeild karla championship when KR beat ÍR 3–2 in the finals. He led KR to a 14-7 record during the 2019-20 season before the last game and the playoffs were canceled due to the coronavirus pandemic in Iceland. In May 2020, he was fired from his post. Less than two weeks later, he was hired as an assistant coach to Stjarnan.

On 19 March 2022, he won the Icelandic Basketball Cup when Stjarnan defeated reigning national champions Þór Þorlákshöfn in the 2022 Cup Finals.

Awards, titles and accomplishments

Awards
Úrvalsdeild karla Coach of the Year: 2010
Úrvalsdeild kvenna Coach of the Year (3): 2014, 2015, 2016

Men's titles
Icelandic men's champions (4): 2000, 20091, 2010, 2019
Icelandic Basketball Cup: 2010
Icelandic Supercup (3): 2010
Icelandic Company Cup (2): 20081, 2010
1 As assistant coach

Women's titles
Icelandic women's champions (3): 2014, 2015, 2016
Icelandic Basketball Cup: 2016
Icelandic Supercup (4): 2012, 2014, 2015, 2016
Icelandic Company Cup: 2012

References

Ingi Thor Steinthorsson
Living people
Ingi Thor Steinthorsson
Ingi Thor Steinthorsson
1972 births
Ingi Thor Steinthorsson
Ingi Thor Steinthorsson